Hold Me in Your Arms may refer to:

"Hold Me in Your Arms" by Ray Heindorf, Charles Henderson and Don Pippin, popularized by Doris Day in the movie Young at Heart
"Hold Me in Your Arms" by Brad Paisley
Hold Me in Your Arms (album), a 1988 album by Rick Astley
"Hold Me in Your Arms" (Rick Astley song), 1988
"Hold Me in Your Arms" (Southern Sons song), 1991
"Hold Me in Your Arms" by The Black Keys, from their album Thickfreakness
"Hold Me in Your Arms" (The Trews song), a 2007 song by The Trews from their album No Time for Later
"Hold Me In Your Arms", a song recorded by Pixie Lott